City Hall is a historic city hall located at Forest City, Holt County, Missouri.  It was built in 1901, and is a two-story, rectangular red brick building measuring 80 feet by 40 feet.  It sits on a foundation of smoothed and coursed native limestone blocks.  It features a square clock tower.

It was listed on the National Register of Historic Places in 1979.

References

Clock towers in Missouri
Government buildings on the National Register of Historic Places in Missouri
Government buildings completed in 1901
Buildings and structures in Holt County, Missouri
National Register of Historic Places in Holt County, Missouri